Jorge Luis Sotomayor (born 29 March 1988) is an Argentine footballer.

He played during several years in Chilean football. There, he defended clubs such as Deportes La Serena, Unión San Felipe or Deportes Melipilla.

External links
 
 

1988 births
Living people
Argentine footballers
Argentine expatriate footballers
Club Atlético River Plate footballers
Unión San Felipe footballers
Deportes La Serena footballers
C.D. Antofagasta footballers
Rangers de Talca footballers
Chilean Primera División players
Primera B de Chile players
Expatriate footballers in Chile
Association football defenders
Sportspeople from Buenos Aires Province